The Journal of Genetics and Genomics (sometimes abbreviated JGG) is a monthly peer-reviewed scientific journal covering the fields of genetics and genomics. It was established in 1974 as Acta Genetica Sinica, obtaining its current name in 2007. It is published by Elsevier and the editor-in-chief is Yongbiao Xue (Chinese Academy of Sciences). According to the Journal Citation Reports, the journal has a 2017 impact factor of 4.066.

References

External links

Genetics journals
Elsevier academic journals
English-language journals
Monthly journals
Publications established in 1974
Genomics journals